St. Nicholas Cathedral is a Russian Orthodox church in Dushanbe, Tajikistan. It is the Cathedral church of the Russian Orthodox Eparchy of Dushanbe and Tajikistan.

History 

The cathedral was completed at the end of 1943 due to a certain softening that occurred in the USSR in relation to the Patriarchal Church that year.

After the collapse of the USSR, a large number of Orthodox families to left the country, leaving the cathedral with no visitors. In the spring of 2005, the St. Nicholas Cathedral began its first major reconstruction, which continued until 2011.

See also 
 Russians in Tajikistan
 Christianity in Tajikistan
 Dushanbe

References 

Churches in Tajikistan
Buildings and structures in Dushanbe
Nicholas, Dushanbe
Russia–Tajikistan relations
Churches completed in 1943